Leo I of Cava (? –1079) was an Italian abbot and saint. He is remembered as the second abbot of the Abbey of La Trinità della Cava, located at Cava de' Tirreni and is revered as a saint by the Catholic Church.

Veneration
The first four abbots of Cava were officially recognized as saints on December 21, 1893, by Pope Leo XIII. The first four abbots are Alferius; Leo I (1050–79); Peter of Pappacarbone (1079–1122); and Constabilis (1122 - 1124).

See also
Cava de' Tirreni, Italy (Italia)
La Trinità della Cava

Bibliography 
 Hugone abbate Venusino, Vitae quatuor  priorum abbatum cavensium Alferii, Leonis, Petri et Costabilis  edizioni Leone Mattei Cerasoli, in Rerum italicarum scriptores – Bologna 1941
 Simeone Leone, Dalla fondazione del cenobio al secolo XVI, in La badia di Cava, edizioni Di Mauro – Cava de’ Tirreni, 1985
 Massimo Buchicchio, Cronotassi degli Abati della Santissima Trinità de La Cava. Cava de' Tirreni, 2010
 Joseph Ratzinger, Santi. Gli autentici apologeti della Chiesa, Lindau Edizioni, Torino 2007

External links
 San Leone I Abate

1079 deaths
Italian abbots
Italian Benedictines
11th-century Italian clergy
11th-century Christian saints
Religious leaders from Lucca
Medieval Italian saints
Year of birth unknown
People from Lucca